Diego Duarte may refer to:
 Diego Duarte (art collector)
 Diego Duarte (footballer)
 Diego Duarte Delgado, Colombian sport shooter